

Events

Works
 Dante, La Vita Nuova (published)
 Mathieu of Boulogne, Liber lamentationum Matheoluli (The Lamentations of Matheolus) (written)

Births

Deaths
  (born 1225), Galician admiral, poet and troubadour

13th-century poetry
Poetry